The Songwriters Hall of Fame (SHOF) is an American institution founded in 1969 by songwriter Johnny Mercer, music publisher/songwriter Abe Olman, and publisher/executive Howie Richmond to honor those whose work, represent, and maintain, the heritage and legacy of a spectrum of the most beloved English language songs from the world's popular music songbook. It not only celebrates these established songwriters, but is also involved in the development of new English language songwriting talent through workshops, showcases, and scholarships. There are many programs designed to teach and discover new English language songwriters. Nile Rodgers serves as the organization's chairman.

The Hall of Fame was formed in 1969, and in 2010, an exhibit was put on display online inside the Grammy Museum at L.A. Live in Los Angeles. The Hall has no permanent place of residence, and because the awards are not televised, there would be no other digital recording of the event for posterity.

There are numerous examples of collaborating songwriters being inducted in unison, with each person being considered a separate entrant. The inaugural year featured 120 inductees, many of whom had a professional partnership, such as Rodgers and Hammerstein. Burt Bacharach and Hal David followed in 1972. Betty Comden and Adolph Green were selected in 1980, and Lieber and Stoller were inducted in 1985. John Lennon and Paul McCartney were inducted in 1987. In the same year, Gerry Goffin, Carole King, Barry Mann, and Cynthia Weil were inducted into the SHOF.  Motown's Holland-Dozier-Holland team were honored the following year. Elton John and Bernie Taupin were among those chosen in 1992, and the pop music group the Bee Gees had all three brothers inducted in 1994. In 1995, Bob Gaudio and Bob Crewe as well as Gamble and Huff were inducted. John Denver was inducted in 1996. The Eagles' Glenn Frey and Don Henley were co-inductees in 2000. Queen was the first rock band to have all their band members inducted in 2003. Five members of Earth, Wind & Fire were in the class of 2010. Four members of Kool and the Gang were honored in 2018. Through 2019, 461 individuals were inducted into the SHOF.

Due to the COVID-19 pandemic, the 2020 Songwriters Hall of Fame Induction Ceremony was postponed until 2022. The Songwriters Hall of Fame president and CEO, Linda Moran, chose to move the event so that a proper celebration could take place.
New 2020 inductees would include Mariah Carey, Chad Hugo, the Isley Brothers, Annie Lennox, Steve Miller, Rick Nowels, William “Mickey” Stevenson, Dave Stewart and Pharrell Williams. Additionally, Jody Gerson of Universal Music Group will be given the Abe Olman Publisher Award and Paul Williams is set to receive the Johnny Mercer Award. On March 8, 2022, the ceremony was officially announced to take place on June 16, 2022, at its longtime location, the Marriott Marquis New York’s Times Square.

Abe Olman Publisher Award
The Abe Olman Publisher Award is given to publishers who have had a substantial number of songs that have become world-renowned and who have helped to further the careers and success of many songwriters.
1983 – Howard S. Richmond
1986 – Leonard Feist
1987 – Lou Levy
1988 – Buddy Killen
1990 – Charles Koppelman & Martin Bandier
1991 – Frank Military & Jay Morgenstern
1992 – Bonnie Bourne
1993 – Berry Gordy
1994 – Buddy Morris
1995 – Al Gallico
1996 – Freddy Bienstock
1997 – Gene Goodman
1998 – Irwin Z. Robinson
1999 – Bill Lowery
2000 – Julian Aberbach
2001 – Ralph Peer
2002 – Edward P. Murphy
2003 – Nicholas Firth
2004 – Les Bider
2005 – Beebe Bourne
2006 – Allen Klein
2007 – Don Kirshner
2008 – Milt Okun
2009 – Maxyne Lang
2010 – Keith Mardak
2012 – Lance Freed
2017 – Caroline Bienstock
2022 – Jody Gerson

Board of Directors Award
The Board of Directors Award is presented to an individual selected by the SHOF Board in recognition of his or her service to the songwriting community and the advancement of popular music.
1986 – Jule Styne
1988 – Stanley Adams
1992 – Edward P. Murphy
1996 – Anna Sosenko & Oscar Brand
1997 – Thomas A. Dorsey

Contemporary Icon Award
The Contemporary Icon Award was established in 2015 to recognize songwriter-artists who attained an iconic status in pop culture.
2015 – Lady Gaga
2019 – Justin Timberlake

Global Ambassador Award
In 2017, Pitbull was presented the Global Ambassador Award. The award is given to an individual "whose music has true worldwide appeal, crossing genre, cultural and national boundaries".

Hal David Starlight Award

First presented in 2004 as the Starlight Award, the prize was renamed in 2006 as the Hal David Starlight Award in honor of the SHOF Chairman's longtime support of young songwriters. Award recipients are gifted songwriters who are at an apex in their careers and are making a significant impact in the music industry via their original songs.
2004 – Rob Thomas (Matchbox Twenty)
2005 – Alicia Keys
2006 – John Mayer
2007 – John Legend
2008 – John Rzeznik (Goo Goo Dolls)
2009 – Jason Mraz
2010 – Taylor Swift
2011 – Drake
2012 – Ne-Yo
2013 – Benny Blanco
2014 – Dan Reynolds (Imagine Dragons)
2015 – Nate Ruess (Fun)
2016 – Nick Jonas
2017 – Ed Sheeran
2018 – Sara Bareilles
2019 – Halsey
2022 - Lil Nas X

Howie Richmond Hitmaker Award
The Howie Richmond Hitmaker Award is given to musical artists who have had a substantial number of hit songs across a lengthy career, and who, according to the Hall of Fame, "recognize the importance of songs and their writers".
1981 – Chuck Berry
1983 – Rosemary Clooney & Margaret Whiting
1990 – Whitney Houston
1991 – Barry Manilow
1995 – Michael Bolton
1996 – Gloria Estefan
1998 – Diana Ross
1999 – Natalie Cole
2000 – Johnny Mathis
2001 – Dionne Warwick
2002 – Garth Brooks
2003 – Clive Davis
2008 – Anne Murray
2009 – Tom Jones
2010 – Phil Ramone
2011 – Chaka Khan
2014 – Doug Morris
2016 – Seymour Stein
2018 – Lucian Grainge

Johnny Mercer Award

The Johnny Mercer Award is the highest honor bestowed by the event. It goes to writers already inducted into the Songwriters Hall of Fame for having established a history of outstanding creative works.
1980 – Frank Sinatra
1981 – Yip Harburg
1982 – Harold Arlen
1983 – Sammy Cahn
1985 – Alan Jay Lerner
1986 – Mitchell Parish
1987 – Jerry Herman
1990 – Jerry Bock & Sheldon Harnick
1991 – Betty Comden & Adolph Green
1992 – Burton Lane
1993 – Jule Styne
1994 – Irving Caesar
1995 – Cy Coleman
1996 – Burt Bacharach & Hal David
1997 – Alan and Marilyn Bergman
1998 – Paul Simon
1999 – Stephen Sondheim
2000 – Jerry Leiber and Mike Stoller
2001 – Billy Joel
2002 – Carole King
2003 – Jimmy Webb
2004 – Stevie Wonder
2005 – Smokey Robinson
2006 – Kris Kristofferson
2007 – Dolly Parton
2008 – Paul Anka
2009 – Holland–Dozier–Holland
2010 – Phil Collins
2011 – Barry Mann & Cynthia Weil
2013 – Elton John & Bernie Taupin
2014 – Kenneth Gamble & Leon Huff
2015 – Van Morrison
2016 – Lionel Richie
2017 – Alan Menken
2018 – Neil Diamond
2019 – Carole Bayer Sager
2022 – Paul Williams
2023 – Tim Rice

Patron of the Arts
The Patron of the Arts is presented to influential industry executives who are not primarily in the music business but are great supporters of the performing arts.
1988 – Martin Segal
1989 – Roger Enrico
1990 – Edgar Bronfman Jr.
1991 – Edwin M. Cooperman
1992 – Jonathan Tisch
1993 – Michel Roux
1994 – Philip Dusenberry
1995 – Theodore J. Forstmann
1996 – Sumner Redstone
1997 – Dr. Samuel LeFrak
1998 – David Checketts
1999 – Robert Mondavi
2001 – Iris Cantor
2002 – Stephen Swid
2003 – Martin Bandier
2004 – Michael Goldstein
2005 – Henry Juszkiewicz

Pioneer Award
The Pioneer Award was established in 2012 to recognize the career of a historic creator of an extensive body of musical work that has been a major influence on generations of songwriters.
2012 – Woody Guthrie
2013 – Berry Gordy

Sammy Cahn Lifetime Achievement Award

Named for the former President of the Songwriters Hall of Fame, the Sammy Cahn Lifetime Achievement Award is given to individuals or teams who are recognized as having done a great deal to further the successes of songwriters.
1980 – Ethel Merman
1981 – Tony Bennett
1982 – Dinah Shore
1983 – Willie Nelson
1984 – Benny Goodman
1985 – John Hammond
1987 – Jerry Wexler
1988 – Dick Clark
1989 – Quincy Jones
1990 – B.B. King
1991 – Gene Autry
1992 – Nat King Cole
1993 – Ray Charles
1994 – Lena Horne
1995 – Steve Lawrence & Eydie Gormé
1996 – Frankie Laine
1997 – Vic Damone
1998 – Berry Gordy
1999 – Kenny Rogers
2000 – Neil Diamond
2001 – Gloria & Emilio Estefan
2002 – Stevie Wonder
2003 – Patti LaBelle
2004 – Neil Sedaka
2005 – Les Paul
2006 – Peter, Paul & Mary
2012 – Bette Midler

Scholarship awards

Abe Olman Scholarship 
Abe Olman was an American songwriter and music publisher. He was later director of ASCAP, and a founder of the Songwriters Hall of Fame which, in 1983, named the Abe Olman Publisher Award. In his honor, the Abe Olman Scholarship is given out each year by his family in the interest of encouraging and supporting the careers of young songwriters. The scholarship has been awarded since 1989 to individuals such as Matt Katz-Bohen, John Legend, and Bebe Rexha.

Holly Prize
Created in 2010, the Holly Prize is a tribute to the legacy of Buddy Holly, a SHOF inductee. The award recognizes and supports a new "all-in songwriter" — an exceptionally talented and inspired young musician/singer/songwriter whose work exhibits the qualities of Holly's music: true, great and original. The Holly Prize is administered and juried by the SongHall.
2010 – Laura Warshauer
2011 – Kendra Morris
2012 – Emily King
2013 – Ben Howard
2014 – Jack Skuller
2015 – Jenny O.
2016 – Shun Ng
2017 – Katie Pruitt
2018 – Sylvan Esso
2019 – Adia Victoria

NYU Steinhardt Songwriting Scholar Award
Announced in 2011, along with a collaboration between the Songwriters Hall of Fame and NYU Steinhardt's Department of Music and Performing Arts Professions, the NYU Steinhardt Songwriting Scholar Award is presented to a music composition student whose work holds great potential for success in the field, and embodies the art, craft, individuality and qualities of communication of the best songwriting.

Towering Performance Award
The Towering Performance Award is given in recognition of one-of-a-kind performances by one-of-a-kind singers that have recorded outstanding and unforgettable interpretations of songs that have become iconic standards.
2003 - Tony Bennett
2005 – Bill Medley
2009 – Andy Williams
2012 – Ben E. King

Towering Song Award
The Towering Song Award is given to creators of an individual song that has influenced the culture in a unique way over the years.
1995 – "As Time Goes By" (written by Herman Hupfeld)
1996 – "Happy Birthday To You" (written by Patty Hill and Mildred J. Hill)
1997 – "How High The Moon" (lyrics by Nancy Hamilton and music by Morgan Lewis)
1998 – "The Christmas Song" (written by Robert Wells and Mel Tormé)
1999 – "Fly Me To The Moon" (written by Bart Howard)
2000 – "All of Me" (written by Gerald Marks and Seymour Simons)
2000 – "You Are My Sunshine" (recorded by Jimmie Davis)
2001 – "Let Me Call You Sweetheart" (lyrics by Beth Slater Whitson and music by Leo Friedman)
2002 – "You're a Grand Old Flag" (written by George M. Cohan)
2003 – "I Left My Heart in San Francisco" (written by George Cory and Douglass Cross)
2004 – "What the World Needs Now is Love" (lyrics by Hal David and music by Burt Bacharach)
2005 – "You've Lost That Lovin' Feelin'" (written by Phil Spector, Barry Mann and Cynthia Weil)
2006 – "When the Saints Are Marching In" (lyrics by Katharine Purvis and music by James Milton Black)
2007 - "Unchained Melody" (lyrics by Hy Zaret and music by Alex North)
2008 – "Take Me Out to the Ball Game" (lyrics by Jack Norworth and music by Albert Von Tilzer)
2009 – "Moon River" (lyrics by Johnny Mercer and music by Henry Mancini)
2010 – "Bridge Over Troubled Water" (written by Paul Simon)
2011 – "It Was a Very Good Year" (written by Ervin Drake)
2012 – "Stand by Me" (written by Ben E. King, Jerry Leiber and Mike Stoller)
2013 – "A Change Is Gonna Come" (written by Sam Cooke)
2014 – "Over The Rainbow" (lyrics by E.Y. Harburg and music by Harold Arlen)
2015 – "What a Wonderful World" (written by Bob Thiele and George David Weiss)

Visionary Leadership Award
Created in 2011, The Visionary Leadership Award recognizes members of the Hall of Fame Board of Directors who have made a significant contribution in furthering the ongoing mission of the organization.
2011 – Hal David
2014 – Del Bryant
2015 – John A. Lofrumento
2019 – Martin Bandier

See also
List of Songwriters Hall of Fame inductees
Nashville Songwriters Hall of Fame
List of music museums

References

External links

NAMM Oral History Interview with Linda Moran June 12, 2013

American music awards
Awards established in 1969
Music halls of fame
Halls of fame in New York (state)
Songwriting awards
Writers halls of fame